Elsa Bassermann (born Elsa Sarah Schiff; January 14, 1878 – May 30, 1961) was a German screenwriter, stage and film actress. She was married to Albert Bassermann and often acted with him. As she was Jewish the couple had to leave Nazi Germany and go into exile in Switzerland and the United States. She later returned to Germany, where she died in 1961.

Partial filmography

 Gerda Gerovius (1913)
 Der letzte Tag (1913)
 Urteil des Arztes (1914)
 Du sollst keine anderen Götter haben (1917)
 Der eiserne Wille (1917)
 Herr und Diener (1917)
 Father and Son (1918)
 The Zaarden Brothers (1918)
 Doctor Schotte (1918)
 Lorenzo Burghardt (1918)
 Das Werk seines Lebens (1919) - Friedel
 Eine schwache Stunde (1919)
 Die Duplizität der Ereignisse (1920)
 The Voice (1920)
 The Sons of Count Dossy (1920) - Gräfin
 Masks (1920)
 Dolls of Death (1920) - Konstanze
 Der Frauenarzt (1921) - Frau Dr. Holländer
 The Last Witness (1921)
 Lucrezia Borgia (1922)
 Christopher Columbus (1923) - Ehefrau des Columbus
 Alraune (1930) - A lady
 Dreyfus (1930) - Parisian lady
 A Woman Branded (1931) - Frau Thorn, Ilses Mutter
 Kadetten (1931) - Gräfin Kleist
 Last Love (1935) - Hanna von Hooven
 Escape (1940) - Mrs. Henning
 New Wine (1941) - Minor Role (uncredited)
 Desperate Journey (1942) - Frau Raeder
 Madame Curie (1943) - Madame Perot
 The Captain from Köpenick (completed in 1941, released in 1945) (aka I Was a Criminal) - Mrs. Marie Hoprecht
 Rhapsody in Blue (1945) - Guest (uncredited) (final film role)

Bibliography

External links

1878 births
1961 deaths
German stage actresses
German film actresses
German silent film actresses
Film people from Leipzig
Actors from Leipzig
Jewish emigrants from Nazi Germany to the United States
German expatriates in Switzerland
20th-century German actresses
German screenwriters
American women screenwriters
German women screenwriters
20th-century American women writers
20th-century American screenwriters